19 par Patricia Kaas is the 2009 compilation album by French singer Patricia Kaas.

Track listing

Charts

References

2009 albums
Patricia Kaas albums